The Men's mass start competition at the Biathlon World Championships 2020 was held on 23 February 2020.

Results
The race was started at 15:00.

References

Men's mass start